San Ignacio (the Spanish language name of St. Ignatius) is a common toponym in parts of the world where that language is or was spoken:

Argentina 
 San Ignacio, Argentina, Misiones Province
 San Ignacio Miní, a Jesuit mission in  Misiones Province

Belize 
 San Ignacio, Belize (Cayo District), towns in western Belize

Bolivia 
 San Ignacio de Moxos
 San Ignacio de Velasco
 San Ignacio, Mamoré
 San Ignacio de Zamucos

Chile 
 San Ignacio, Chile, a town in the Ñuble Region

Costa Rica 
 San Ignacio District, Acosta, San José Province

El Salvador 
 San Ignacio, Chalatenango

Honduras 
 San Ignacio, Francisco Morazán

Marianas 
 former colonial name of Pagan

Mexico 
 San Ignacio, Baja California Sur
 San Ignacio, Chihuahua (Práxedis G. Guerrero)
 San Ignacio, Sinaloa
 San Ignacio Río Muerto (Sonora)
 San Ignacio Lagoon
 San Ignacio Cerro Gordo, Jalisco

Paraguay 
 San Ignacio, Paraguay, a city and district in the Misiones Department

Peru 
 San Ignacio, Perú
 San Ignacio District, Peru
 San Ignacio Province, Cajamarca Region

Spain 
 San Ignacio (Ponga)

United States 
 San Ignacio, Texas

See also
St. Ignatius Church (disambiguation)